The Antioch Police Department is a police department serving the East Bay city of Antioch, California in the San Francisco Bay Area.

History
The police department was created in 1872 to handle security and law enforcement in the coal mining town of hundreds that was 19th Century Antioch. By the 2010 census the department was policing over 102,000 Antiochites. The police chief is Tammany Brooks. In 2011 the department expressed serious concerns for the lack of a planning for a safety officer at the future Antioch eBART station. Due to funding issues, this station may be actually be policed in whole or in part by the APD instead of the BART Police Department.

See also
 Killing of Angelo Quinto
 List of law enforcement agencies in California

External links
Antioch police official page

References

Antioch, California
Municipal police departments of California
Law enforcement in the San Francisco Bay Area